Liu Hsin-mei (柳信美) is a professional pool player from Chinese Taipei. She has won the WPA Women's World Nine-ball Championship twice, in 1999 and 2002.

Biography
Both of Liu's parents were blind, and provided massages for a living. As a young girl, Liu would transport her parents by bicycle to customers' houses. At 18, she started socialising at pool halls, and took up playing pool. Later, she worked at a karaoke bar, during which she was regularly drinking and taking drugs, including amphetamines.

She studied at The Taipei Physical Education College. In 2001, she started studying sports management at Taipei Physical Education College, with the ambition of becoming a teacher.

She won the WPA Women's World Nine-ball Championship in 1999 and 2002, and was runner-up in 2004 and 2006. Shortly after winning the 2002 championship, she published an autobiographical book, Taiwan A-mei (台灣阿美).

Tournament results
 2004 WPA Amway Cup 9-Ball World Open	
 2003 All Japan Championship 9-Ball
 2002 WPA Women's World Nine-ball Championship
 2001 All Japan Championship 9-Ball
 1999 WPA Women's World Nine-ball Championship
 1998 All Japan Championship 9-Ball
 1993 BCA U.S. Open Straight Pool Championship

References

Living people
Taiwanese pool players
Female pool players
World champions in pool
Year of birth missing (living people)